Gregory Ellis Buttle (born June 20, 1954 in Atlantic City, New Jersey) is a retired American football linebacker for the New York Jets. He played college football at Penn State University. He was named a Consensus All-American in 1975. In 2005, he was inducted into the Nassau County Sports Hall of Fame.

High school
Buttle grew up in Linwood, New Jersey, and attended Mainland Regional High School in Linwood. Buttle was a 4-sport letterman in football, basketball, baseball and track and field, and was also a champion oarsman while on the Margate City Beach Patrol, as well as participating in musical theatre. He is a member of the Ocean Rowing Hall of Fame.

Penn State
A 1975 Consensus All-American, Buttle was also the captain of the Nittany Lions that year. Considered by Penn State coach Joe Paterno "as fine a linebacker as any prospect produced by this school," he still holds the school records for tackles in a game (24), and season (165). He stood atop the Penn State career tackles list for over 30 years, until Paul Posluszny surpassed his mark of 343 versus Wisconsin on November 4, 2006. In 2000 Buttle was honored with the Butkus Silver Anniversary Award, which honors the top college linebacker from 25 years ago. He has been named a Penn State All-Time NFL Player.

New York Jets
Buttle was selected in the 3rd round (#67 overall) of the 1976 NFL Draft by the New York Jets for whom he would play 9 seasons
(1976–1984) at starting outside linebacker. Two interceptions in the Jets' 1981 playoff game against the Buffalo Bills helped fuel a comeback effort, which ultimately fell short, in the franchise's first playoff game since the 1969 season. He was a member of defensive coordinator Joe Gardi's Swarm defense which included fellow Nittany Lion Lance Mehl, as well as the New York Sack Exchange defensive line. Buttle was cut in August 1985 by Joe Walton.

Broadcasting
Buttle served as an on-air analyst for WCBS-TV in New York City, alongside play-by-play man Ian Eagle, for Jets preseason games, and hosts Jets Gameday on the Jets Radio Network and ESPN New York alongside Don La Greca. He also serves as an analyst on the SNY studio show Jets Nation. He was the temporary fill-in host on WABC radio in NYC, in the 10:00 AM – noon slot, until Geraldo Rivera took the chair permanently on Jan. 3, 2012. On August 7, 2018 it was announced that Buttle would no longer work alongside Eagle for Jets preseason games, having been replaced by former Jets tight end Anthony Becht.

Personal life
Buttle has received numerous honors and awards in recognition of his commitment to the community including National Spokesman for the United Way. He holds a Bachelor of Arts in general arts and sciences from Penn State University. He lives in Northport, New York with his wife, Rita, son Greg Jr. and two daughters, Christina and Allegra.

In 1983, Buttle opened a fitness center in East Meadow, New York.

References

External links
 Career statistics at databasefootball.com
 Greg Buttle on the MSG Network and SNY.tv

1954 births
Living people
American football linebackers
New York Jets players
Penn State Nittany Lions football players
New York Jets announcers
Arena football announcers
National Football League announcers
Sportspeople from Atlantic City, New Jersey
Mainland Regional High School (New Jersey) alumni
People from Linwood, New Jersey
All-American college football players
Players of American football from New Jersey
People from Northport, New York